Scanochiton is an extinct genus of polyplacophoran molluscs. Scanochiton became extinct during the Cretaceous period.

References 

Prehistoric chiton genera